Fakhrabad-e Yek (also Romanized as Fakhrābād-e Yek; also known as Fakhrābād) is a village in Moezziyeh Rural District, Chatrud District, Kerman County, Kerman Province, Iran. At the 2006 census, its population was 60, in 20 families.

References 

Populated places in Kerman County